Nicoletta Manzione (born April 14, 1966 in Rome) is an Italian journalist. She is also the Director of RAI programme Rai Parlamento.

Biography 
Manzione studied political science, joined RAI in 1989 as an intern, and eventually became an editor. She joined TG1 where she was foreign manager and editor, and handled the 13:30 edition of the newscast. She also manages the programme Unomattina.

Director of Rai Parlamento 
On August 4, 2016 she was appointed director by managing director Antonio Campo Dall'Orto. 

As of June 2019, she is the correspondent for radio and television news reports from France.

References 

1966 births
Living people
Mass media people from Rome
Journalists from Rome
Rai (broadcaster) people